Symphony No. 1 is a four-movement orchestral composition by American composer Bernard Herrmann.  The work was jointly commissioned in 1940 by CBS and the New York Philharmonic and was completed March 29, 1941, though Herrmann revised the work in 1973.  It premiered July 27, 1941 at the CBS Radio Theater, with Herrmann conducting the CBS Symphony Orchestra.  Though he would continue to compose concert music and film scores throughout his later life, the symphony would be Herrmann's last foray into nonprogrammatic music.

Style and composition
The symphony has a duration of roughly 35 minutes and is composed in four movements:
Maestoso: Allegro pesante
Scherzo
Andante sostenuto
Rondo: Epilogue à la processional
On the experience of composing absolute music, Herrmann said, "For the first time I was not confined to the outline of a story. It was not necessary to depict waves, portray the anguish of a lost soul, or look for a love theme... Consequently, working on the Symphony I had a Roman holiday."  Albert Imperato of Gramophone compared the music favorably with that of other 20th century composers Samuel Barber, William Walton, and William Schuman.

Reception
Initial critical response to the symphony was favorable, though the work has fallen into relative obscurity since its premiere.  In 2011, Brian Gittis of The Paris Review called the work "an underappreciated symphony."  Gramophone'''s Albert Imperato also argued for a reassessment of the piece, calling it "more than a curiosity."  Herrmann biographer Steven C. Smith further commented: 

Discography
1974: Bernard Herrmann – Symphony, performed by the National Philharmonic Orchestra, Bernard Herrmann (dir.) - Unicorn Records (reissued 1993 on CD).
1993:  Herrmann: Symphony; Schuman: New England Triptych'', performed by the Phoenix Symphony, James Sedares (dir.) - Koch Records.

References

Sources

Compositions by Bernard Herrmann
20th-century classical music
Herrmann 1
1941 compositions
Compositions for symphony orchestra
Music commissioned by the New York Philharmonic